is a Japanese professional baseball Catcher for the Fukuoka SoftBank Hawks of Nippon Professional Baseball (NPB).

Professional career
On October 22, 2015, Tanigawara was drafted  by the Fukuoka Softbank Hawks in the 2015 Nippon Professional Baseball draft.

In 2016–2020 season, he played in the Western League of NPB's minor leagues and played in informal matches against Shikoku Island League Plus's teams.

In the 2020 Japan Series against the Yomiuri Giants, he was selected as the Japan Series roster.

On June 19, 2021, Tanigawara debuted in the Pacific League against the Hokkaido Nippon-Ham Fighters, and recorded his first Home run. In 2021 season, he played 59 games and was used primarily as a substitute and defensive lineman.

In 2022 season, Tanigawara contributed to the team primarily as an outfield defender and substitute, finishing the season with a .234 batting average and eight runs batted in in 75 games. However, while COVID-19 caused the team's main players to be eliminated from the Player registration one after another, he went 4 hits-for-4 at bats　with four RBI against the Tohoku Rakuten Golden Eagles on August 23.　He was a member of the "Chikugo Hawks"  and supported the team until the main players returned. (a nickname given to the younger reserve players. Chikugo is the name of the place where the Hawks farm team is located.)

References

External links

 Career statistics - NPB.jp
 45 Kenta Tanigawara PLAYERS2022 - Fukuoka SoftBank Hawks Official site

1997 births
Living people
Fukuoka SoftBank Hawks players
Japanese baseball players
Nippon Professional Baseball catchers
Baseball people from Aichi Prefecture